New Line Theatre in St. Louis, Missouri, is an alternative musical theatre company producing challenging, adult, politically and socially relevant works of musical theatre. The company was created in 1991 and produces world premieres such as Love Kills, Johnny Appleweed, Woman with Pocketbook, She's Hideous, In the Blood, Attempting the Absurd, and The AmberKlavier; lesser known Broadway and off Broadway shows such as High Fidelity, Passing Strange, bare, The Wild Party, Floyd Collins, A New Brain, March of the Falsettos, Passion, The Robber Bridegroom, The Nervous Set, and Bat Boy; abstract musicals such as Hair, Jacques Brel is Alive and Well and Living in Paris, and Songs for a New World; absurdist musicals such as Reefer Madness, Attempting the Absurd, The Cradle Will Rock, and Anyone Can Whistle; concept musicals such as Company, Assassins, Urinetown, Chicago, Sunday in the Park with George, and Cabaret; and reinterpretations of more mainstream works, such as Evita, Man of La Mancha, Camelot, Pippin, Sweeney Todd, Grease, and Into the Woods.

New Line claims to take philosophical and practical inspiration from theatre models of the 1960s, including Caffé Cino, Cafe LaMaMa ETC, Judson Poets Theatre, Joan Littlewood's People’s Theatre Workshop in London, and to a lesser extent from the Living Theatre, the Open Theatre, and various theatre collectives in the US and Europe.

New Line has produced the first productions after Broadway of the musicals High Fidelity, Cry-Baby, and Hands on a Hardbody, to enthusiastic reviews, redeeming them after their brief New York runs, giving them new lives in regional theatre.

New Line Theatre has been honored by the St. Louis Theater Circle with a special award for the company's body of work over the years, and feature stories in American Theatre (magazine) and The Riverfront Times.

Past shows

1991–1992
 A Tribute to the Rock Musicals *
 Attempting the Absurd *
1992–1993
 Smokin' Santa *
 A Tribute to Stephen Sondheim *
1993–1994
 A Tribute to the Dark Side *
 Breaking Out in Harmony *
 Assassins **
1994–1995
 Pippin
 In the Blood *
1995–1996
 Company
 Out on Broadway *
 Sweeney Todd: The Demon Barber of Fleet Street
1996–1997
 Passion **
 Jacques Brel is Alive and Well and Living in Paris
 The Ballad of Little Mikey **
1997–1998
 Extreme Sondheim *
 March of the Falsettos
 Woman with Pocketbook *
 Assassins
1998–1999
 Songs for a New World **
 Camelot
 Into the Woods
1999–2000
 Floyd Collins **
 Out on Broadway 2000 *
 Hair
2000–2001
 Cabaret
 Anyone Can Whistle
 Hair
2001–2002
 The Cradle Will Rock
 A New Brain **
 Chicago

2002–2003
 The Rocky Horror Show
 Bat Boy: The Musical **
 The Best Little Whorehouse in Texas
2003–2004
 Sunday in the Park with George
 The Nervous Set
 Reefer Madness **
 Hedwig and the Angry Inch
2004–2005
 Man of La Mancha
 She's Hideous *
 The Robber Bridegroom
 Kiss of the Spider Woman
2005–2006
 The Fantasticks
 The AmberKlavier *
 Bat Boy: The Musical
 Jesus Christ Superstar
2006–2007
 Johnny Appleweed *
 Grease Urinetown2007–2008
 Sex, Drugs, and Rock & Roll *
 Assassins High Fidelity **
2008–2009
 Hair Return to the Forbidden Planet **
 The 25th Annual Putnam County Spelling Bee2009–2010
 Love Kills *
 The Wild Party **
 Evita2010–2011
 I Love My Wife **
 Two Gentlemen of Verona Bare: A Pop Opera **

2011–2012
 Passing Strange **
 Cry-Baby **
 High Fidelity2012–2013
 Bloody Bloody Andrew Jackson Next to Normal Bukowsical **
2013–2014
 Night of the Living Dead: A Musical Thriller **
 Rent Hands on a Hardbody **
2014–2015
 Bonnie & Clyde **
 Jerry Springer: The Opera The Threepenny Opera2015–2016
 Heathers: The Musical **
 American Idiot Atomic **
 Tell Me on a Sunday **
2016–2017
 Celebration (revised 2016)
 Zorba Sweet Smell of Success **
 Out on Broadway: The Third Coming *
2017–2018
 Lizzie **
 Anything Goes Yeast Nation2018–2019
 The Zombies of Penzance*
 La Cage aux Folles Be More Chill2019-2020
 Cry-Baby Head Over Heels **
 Urinetown''

An asterisk denotes world premiere; a double-asterisk denotes regional premiere

References

Theatre companies in Missouri
Theatres in St. Louis
Organizations based in St. Louis
Tourist attractions in St. Louis
Music of St. Louis
Non-profit organizations based in St. Louis
1991 establishments in Missouri